Maungati is a lightly populated locality situated approximately 18 miles southwest of Timaru in the Canterbury region of New Zealand's South Island.  It is a small farming community in an area with primarily sheep and cattle farming and some deer farming, and it has a 9-hole golf course and Māori rock drawings.

Maungati comes from the Māori language words "maunga", meaning "mountain", and "tī", meaning "cabbage tree", and thus means "mountain of cabbage tree". There are many cabbage trees in the area.

Demographics

Maungati had a population of 738 at the 2018 New Zealand census, an increase of 6 people (0.8%) since the 2013 census, and an increase of 63 people (9.3%) since the 2006 census. There were 279 households. There were 384 males and 351 females, giving a sex ratio of 1.09 males per female. The median age was 37.5 years (compared with 37.4 years nationally), with 177 people (24.0%) aged under 15 years, 111 (15.0%) aged 15 to 29, 375 (50.8%) aged 30 to 64, and 69 (9.3%) aged 65 or older.

Ethnicities were 91.9% European/Pākehā, 5.7% Māori, 1.2% Pacific peoples, 2.8% Asian, and 3.7% other ethnicities (totals add to more than 100% since people could identify with multiple ethnicities).

The proportion of people born overseas was 15.4%, compared with 27.1% nationally.

Although some people objected to giving their religion, 54.9% had no religion, 38.6% were Christian, 0.4% were Buddhist and 1.2% had other religions.

Of those at least 15 years old, 105 (18.7%) people had a bachelor or higher degree, and 96 (17.1%) people had no formal qualifications. The median income was $38,500, compared with $31,800 nationally. 111 people (19.8%) earned over $70,000 compared to 17.2% nationally. The employment status of those at least 15 was that 357 (63.6%) people were employed full-time, 99 (17.6%) were part-time, and 9 (1.6%) were unemployed.

References 

Waimate District
Populated places in Canterbury, New Zealand